The Spanish Communist Workers' Party (PCOE) is an anti-revisionist Marxist-Leninist communist party in Spain. It was founded in 1973, when Enrique Líster (a Republican general in the Spanish Civil War) revolted against the Eurocommunist line of Communist Party of Spain (PCE) general secretary Santiago Carrillo. The party published Análisis.

History
A catalyst for the split was the condemnation by the PCE of the Soviet intervention in Czechoslovakia in 1968. PCOE was legalized in 1977, during the Spanish transition to democracy. Its sister organisation in Catalonia was the Partit Comunista Obrer de Catalunya. PCOE had a youth organization called the Communist Youth Federation of Spain (Federación de Jóvenes Comunistas de España).

In the 1983 regional elections in the Valencian Community PCOE obtained 6,416 votes (0.34%). It had an electoral pact with Partido Comunista de España Unificado ahead of the regional elections in Madrid of the same year. When PCEU and other groups unified themselves as the Communist Party of the Peoples of Spain, PCOE chose not to participate in the merger.

Reintegration in the PCE and split
In 1985 the majority faction, led by Enrique Lister, decided to dissolve the party and rejoin the PCE, in a congress where the 10,000 members of the PCOE were represented. The majority of the members followed Lister and rejoined the PCE; however, a minority faction decided that they weren't going to join the PCE and kept the party alive, although severely weakened. Today the party publishes Teoría Socialista and Análisis.

The continued PCOE contested the 2015 Spanish elections, fielding candidates in two constituencies (Córdoba and Sevilla), and gaining 1,906 votes in total, and also competed in the 2016 Spanish general election, again only fielding candidates in Córdoba and Sevilla. In 2018 the party contested the Andalusian regional election, competing in the constituencies of Córdoba (975 votes, 0,26%) and Sevilla (2,230 votes, 0,25%).

At the April 2019 Spanish election the PCOE improved its election results compared to 2016. The party contested eight constituencies and gained 9.094 votes.

In 2021 the PCOE is forming the Coalition for Communist Unity with the PCPE for the Madrid regional election.

Electoral performance

References

External links
Party website

Political parties established in 1973
Communist parties in Spain
Anti-revisionist organizations
Stalinist parties
Far-left politics in Spain